Lulusar,, or Lalusar, is a group of mountain peaks and a lake in the Kaghan Valley in the Khyber-Pakhtunkhwa province of Pakistan.

Lulusar Lake 
It flows southwest through the entire length of Kaghan Valley, passing  Jalkhand, Naran, Kaghan, Jared, Paras and Balakot until its confluence with the Jhelum River.

See also 

Lulusar-Dudipatsar National Park
Lake Saiful Muluk - Kaghan Valley
Dudipatsar Lake - Kaghan Valley
Ansoo Lake - Kaghan Valley
Mahodand Lake - Kalam Valley
Kundol Lake - Kalam Valley
Daral Lake - Swat Valley
List of lakes in Pakistan

References 

Lakes of Khyber Pakhtunkhwa
Mountain lakes
Mansehra District